Alexander Vinogradov (28 February 1918 – 10 December 1988) was a Soviet ice hockey player.

Career
Vinogradov started his career playing for CDKA Moscow in the Soviet Championship League in 1946. He joined VVS Moscow for the following season, and played for them until 1954. He rejoined CDSA Moscow for the 1954-55 season, before retiring.

He made 13 appearances for the Soviet Union national ice hockey team, winning a gold medal at the 1954 World Ice Hockey Championships held in Stockholm, Sweden.

References

1918 births
1988 deaths
Honoured Masters of Sport of the USSR
Soviet ice hockey defencemen
Ice hockey people from Moscow